Harald "Harry" Leitinger (born 15 September 1984) is an Austrian professional darts player who competes in events of the Professional Darts Corporation (PDC).

Career
Leitinger entered PDC Q-School in January 2020 and won his tour card on the first day by beating Martijn Kleermaker 5–4 in the final round. He played on the PDC ProTour in 2020 and 2021.

References

External links

1984 births
Living people
Professional Darts Corporation former tour card holders
Austrian darts players
21st-century Austrian people